Midtbygda may refer to:

Places
Midtbygda, Akershus, a village in Lørenskog municipality in Akershus county, Norway
Midtbygda, Buskerud, a village in Røyken municipality in Buskerud county, Norway
Midtbygda, Trøndelag, a village in Meråker municipality in Trøndelag county, Norway